Salaga is a small impact crater in the Argyre quadrangle of Mars, located at 47.19° S and 51.11° W. It is 28.03 km in diameter and lies about halfway between the larger craters of Halley and Hooke. Its name refers to Salaga, a town in Ghana. Along the wall of Salaga Crater, a number of gullies are visible.

See also 
 List of craters on Mars: O-Z

References 

Impact craters on Mars
Argyre quadrangle